Davide Giorgino (born May 4, 1985) is an Italian professional football player who plays for Franciacorta FC, mostly as a defensive midfielder.

Club career
He played 2 seasons (10 games, no goals) in the Serie A for U.S. Lecce.

External links
 

1985 births
People from Brindisi
Footballers from Apulia
Living people
Italian footballers
Association football midfielders
U.S. Lecce players
A.S. Sambenedettese players
Taranto F.C. 1927 players
S.S. Fidelis Andria 1928 players
F.C. Matera players
Parma Calcio 1913 players
Serie A players
Serie C players
Serie D players
Sportspeople from the Province of Brindisi